Janne Tavi (born September 13, 1989) is a Finnish professional ice hockey forward. He is currently a free agent.

Career
He had previously played for Pelicans of the SM-liiga.

Career statistics

Regular season and playoffs

International

References

External links
 

1989 births
Living people
Ice hockey people from Helsinki
Finnish ice hockey forwards
Lahti Pelicans players
Peliitat Heinola players
SaiPa players
JYP Jyväskylä players
KalPa players
Mikkelin Jukurit players
Jokipojat players
HK Poprad players
Finnish expatriate ice hockey players in Slovakia
Finnish expatriate ice hockey players in Sweden
Finnish expatriate ice hockey players in Italy